{{Infobox song
| name       = Bullet
| cover      = Franz Ferdinand - Bullet Cover Art.png
| alt        =
| type       = single
| artist     = Franz Ferdinand
| album      = Right Thoughts, Right Words, Right Action
| released   = 
| recorded   = 2013
| studio     = Black Pudding (Glasgow)
| genre      = {{hlist|Indie rock|post-punk<ref name="av club">{{cite web | url=http://www.avclub.com/review/franz-ferdinand-emright-thoughts-right-words-right-102091 | title=Review: Franz Ferdinand - '"Right Thoughts, Right Words, Right Action | publisher=The A.V. Club | date=27 August 2013 | accessdate=23 April 2016 | author=Zaleski, Annie}}</ref>||dance-punk}}
| length     = 
| label      = Domino
| writer     = 
| producer   = Alex Kapranos
| prev_title = Evil Eye
| prev_year  = 2013
| next_title = Fresh Strawberries
| next_year  = 2014
| misc       = 
}}

"Bullet" is a song by Scottish indie rock band Franz Ferdinand. It was released as the fourth single from the band's fourth studio album, Right Thoughts, Right Words, Right Action'' on 17 January 2014. The song was written by Alex Kapranos, Nick McCarthy, and Alexander Ragnew, recorded during 2013, and produced by Kapranos. The music video for the song was released on 18 November 2013, was directed by Andy Knowles, and was posted on the band's Vevo channel on YouTube.

Track listing

Personnel
Personnel adapted from the album's liner notes
Franz Ferdinand
Alex Kapranos – lead vocals, guitar, composing, mixing, pre-production, and production
Nick McCarthy – backing vocals, rhythm guitar, and keyboards
Bob Hardy – bass guitar
Paul Thomson – drums

Production personnel
Ch4in$ - pre-production
Mike Fraser - mixing
Alexander Ragnew - composing
Mark Ralph - engineering

Charts

Release history

References

2013 songs
2014 singles
Franz Ferdinand (band) songs
Songs written by Alex Kapranos
Songs written by Nick McCarthy
Domino Recording Company singles
Black-and-white music videos